Fishing Lake 89D1 is an Indian reserve of the Fishing Lake First Nation in Saskatchewan.

References

Indian reserves in Saskatchewan
Division No. 10, Saskatchewan
Fishing Lake First Nation